The Breckenbrough Hoard is a hoard of gold and silver coins dating from 1644, during the English Civil War. It is in the collection of the Yorkshire Museum.

Discovery
The hoard was discovered by Mr. C Greensit whilst levelling ground in a covered stockyard at his farm in Breckenbrough in June 1985. The coins were still inside their ceramic vessel, which was covered by a tile and marked by a stone.

It was declared as treasure trove at a coroner's inquest on 25 September 1985 and subsequently examined at the British Museum.

Contents
The hoard contains 30 gold and 1552 silver coins with a total value of £93 and 5 shillings contained within a ceramic Ryedale ware vessel. Of these, 33 coins were Scottish, 35 Irish and 12 Spanish. The hoard also contained two receipts for cheese requisitioned by the Royalist Army on 17 January 1644; these receipts were signed by John Guy the deputy provider general of the York garrison.

References

Archaeology of England
English Civil War
Treasure troves in England
Treasure troves of Medieval Europe
Collections of the Yorkshire Museum
1985 in England
1985 archaeological discoveries
Coin hoards